George Annesley, 2nd Earl of Mountnorris FRS (4 December 1770 – 23 July 1844), styled Viscount Valentia between 1793 and 1816, was a British peer and politician.

Background
Mountnorris was the son of Arthur Annesley, 1st Earl of Mountnorris, and the Hon. Lucy, daughter of George Lyttelton, 1st Baron Lyttelton. He matriculated at Brasenose College, Oxford in 1787, and left in 1789 without taking a degree.

Political career
Mountnorris sat as Member of Parliament for Yarmouth from 1808 to 1810.

Trip to India
In 1802 Henry Salt was appointed secretary and draughtsman to George Annesley, Viscount Valentia. They started on an eastern tour, travelling on Minerva to India via the Cape.  Salt explored the Red Sea area, and in 1805 visited the Ethiopian highlands. He returned to England in 1806. Salt's paintings from the trip were used to illustrate Lord Valentia's Voyages and Travels to India, Ceylon, the Red Sea, Abyssinia and Egypt, in the years 1802, 1803, 1804, 1805, and 1806, published in 1809 in three volumes.

Family
Lord Mountnorris married Lady Anne, daughter of William Courtenay, 2nd Viscount Courtenay, in 1790. She died in January 1835, aged 60. Lord Mountnorris died in July 1844, aged 73. He had no surviving male issue and on his death, the earldom of Mountnorris became extinct, while he was succeeded in the baronetcy of Newport-Pagnell, the barony of Mountnorris and the viscountcy of Valentia by his distant relative, Arthur Annesley, who became the 10th Viscount Valentia.

References

External links 
 

|-

1770 births
1844 deaths
2
Members of the Parliament of the United Kingdom for English constituencies
UK MPs 1807–1812
UK MPs who inherited peerages
Fellows of the Royal Society
George
Place of birth missing